Lowther College was a public school for girls in the United Kingdom in the late 19th and 20th centuries.

The school was originally formed in 1896 at Lytham St. Annes in Lancashire, by Mrs. Florence Morris (later Lindley). In 1920 the school moved to Bodelwyddan Castle, in North Wales, as tenants; the school purchased the property five years later, in 1925. Mrs Lindley continued as headmistress of the college until 1927, when the college was sold to Allied Schools.

The school is thought to have been one of the first public schools for girls to have its own swimming pool. It also had a golf course. The Lowther College Tableaux were well regarded within the community for their musical excellence.

Boys were admitted from 1977. The school closed in 1982 due to financial problems.

Notable former pupils
Miriam Licette (1885–1969), operatic soprano
Sally Oppenheim-Barnes, Baroness Oppenheim-Barnes (born 1930), Conservative politician
Beata Brookes (born 1931), Conservative politician
Jan Holden (1931–2005), actress
Sylvia Law (1931–2004), town planner

Headmistresses
1896–1927: Florence Lindley
1960–1961: Elizabeth Lemarchand

References

Defunct schools in Lancashire
Defunct schools in Denbighshire
Educational institutions disestablished in 1982
Girls' schools in Lancashire
Girls' schools in Wales
Educational institutions established in 1896
1896 establishments in England
1982 disestablishments in Wales
Schools in the Borough of Fylde